New Alhambra may refer to:

 2300 Arena, formerly known as New Alhambra Arena, in Philadelphia, Pennsylvania
 A 2015 album by Elvis Depressedly